Here is written about the Economy of Bokaro. Bokaro Steel City is one of the planned cities of India, a major industrial centre and the fourth largest city in the Indian state of Jharkhand. It is the administrative headquarters of Bokaro district. It is bounded on the east by Dhanbad and Purulia, on the west by Ramgarh and Hazaribagh, on the north by Giridih and on the south by Ranchi. It is accessible through National Highway NH 143 & NH-18 which came between it.

Steel plants 

Bokaro is mostly known for its steel industry. Here is one of the world's, Asia's and India's largest steel plant name the Bokaro Steel Plant. It was established in 1964. It has its headquarters in Bokaro itself. This plant is now a part of Steel Authority of India (SAIL). This plant is located at Marafari. Steel industry is largest industry field in the city of Bokaro. approximately 1/4 or 2/4 of the city covers the steel plant. Many peoples of Bokaro are working here. Here is another famous steel company namely Vedanta Electrosteel Casting Ltd. It is a company headquartered and based in Kolkata. It has set up its plant at Chas.

The Bokaro Steel Plant was established with the collaboration of Soviet Union when the First Prime Minister of India Jawahar lal Nehru desired to establish a Steel Plant in the region. Bokaro Steel Plant expansion to extend its capacity from 7.5 Metric Tonnes before 2011. Vedanta Electrosteel Castings Limited - A Kolkata-based water pipe manufacturer acquired 2,500 acres (10 square kilometres) of land 18 kilometres (11 miles) from the city and has erected its 2.2 MTPA steel plant. The company has invested close to Rs 80 Bn (US$1.6 Bn) on this project which was operational from 2010.

It is the second biggest steel manufacturer in Bokaro behind SAIL's Bokaro Steel Plant.

Sundaram Steel located at Balidih, is the another steel producer in the city. It is located at Balidih Industrial Area. Tannu Tools Pvt Ltd is a manufacturer of tools in Boakro. It have its plant at Balidih Industrial Area, Balidih.

The city has presence of Steel Authority of India Ltd., Oil and Natural Gas Corporation, Vedanta amongst others. Steel Authority of India Limited - The economy of the city is primarily depended on the integrated steel plant established by Steel Authority of India.

Oil, fuels, petroleum and gases 

Oil and Gas Industry is the second major industry in Bokaro behind its steel industry. It has major presence of oil and gas.ONGC Bokaro operates the Bokaro Coal Bed Methan. Bokaro Steel City have its office at Sector 4 and its plant at Marafari. ONGC is a manufacturer, and it produces oil and gas. This company has its headquarters in Delhi/New Delhi. This is one of the biggest oil and gas companies of India. This company produce a major part of economy of Bokaro. Hindustan Petroleum is one of the largest petroleum companies in whole of India. In Balidih there is a depot of Hindustan Petroleum. There is also a bottling plant known as IOC Bottling Plant is located at Balidih. Now Bharat Petroleum will set up a LPG bottling plant and other bottling plant in Balidih, Bokaro Steel City.

ONGC Bokaro operates the Bokaro Coal Bed Methane (CBM) block BK-CBM-2001/1 with 80 per cent stake while the remaining 20 per cent is with Indian Oil Corp (IOC). It plans to invest ₨ 8.23 billion from 2017 to 2018 to achieve a peak production of 0.9 million standard cubic meters per day.Bharat Petroleum Corporation Limited - BPCL will set up a LPG bottling plant and POL (petroleum, oil and lubricants) terminal in Bokaro, the foundation stone of which was laid on 11 August 2019.

GAIL's Jagadishpur–Haldia–Bokaro-Dhamra Pipeline (JHBDPL), one of the largest gas pipeline projects of India, is expected to be completed in 2020 and will run through the area. In January 2020, Triveni Groups proposed the development of Kaushal Triveni Mega Food Park in nearby Chandankiyari.

Railway 
A rail wheel factory is also under development near Damoderpur village, about 35 kilometres from Bokaro, in a joint venture with Indian Railways and Government of Jharkhand.

Cement 

Cement Industry is the third biggest and largest industry in Bokaro Steel City behind steel industry and oil industry. Here is the famous Dalmia Group's cement factory namely Dalmaia East Cement Bharat Limited (DECBL). Its cement plant is at Balidih. Dalmia Group is an Indian grouping many other companies one such part is Dalmaia East Cement Bharat Ltd. Another famous cement factory in the whole city is JP Cement which nearer to Dalmia Cement and this cement plant itself located at Marafari, Bokaro Steel City. JP Cement is the another second largest plant of cement in Bokaro behind Dalmia East Cement Bharat Limited. Both the cement factory are large cement factories.

Crops and agriculture 
Once a small grain trading hub of the region, Chas became notable during the Second World War when the British government used it as a base to supply soldiers fighting in the eastern front against the Japanese. In the 1960s, the Government of India decided to establish the Bokaro Steel Plant nearby, which enhanced the economic activity of the region.

Food processing 
Bihar State Milk Co-operative Federation has a processing plant at Sector - 12. It is another major player in the local economy. It is an economic part of the Bokaro's twin city and a major suburb Chas.

In January 2020, Triveni Groups proposed the development of Kaushal Triveni Mega Food Park in nearby Chandankiyari. Here is also floor mills such as Kamal Flour Mills etc.

Chemical 
RMP is a chemical manufacturer. It is located in Bokaro Steel City at the area of Marafari. It is  one of the famous Chemical manufacturers in the whole city. It is nearer to big companies such as Bokaro Steel Plant and BPSCL Power Plant.

Retail, trade and commerce 

The Bokaro Mall in Sector 3 is the famous shopping mall of the city along with Harsh Vardhan Plaza and City center. Sector 4 is the main commercial area of the city. It is nearer to Marafari. Sector 4 has many shopping complexes around it. City Centre is the main Central Business District of the city. As many peoples the city came here to buy things. Here is also many banks, shopping complexes, playgrounds, etc. Here is also famous temple Jagannath Temple and Jama Masjid at Sector 4. This place is nearer to Marafari. Some parts Bokaro Steel Plant is came under Sector 4 itself. Here is many schools in this area. One of them being DAV Public School, which is one of the most popular schools in India. It also has other branches also. Chinmaya Vidyalayas are also other popular schools. It has branches in other cities like Hyderabad etc.

The city center is the prominent central business district of Bokaro Steel City and one of the most developed and planned CBD in Jharkhand and Eastern India Recent years have seen it grow more than threefold in size. The difference of this market and most other major markets in Indian cities happens to be the planning of the market. There is ample parking space, and the approach roads, as well as those inside the market are wide. The place houses almost all major Indian banks, has various shops in the city for clothing, electronics, and the best food joints. It used to be home for the only cinema theaters in the city, but only two of them (Jeetendra and Pali Plaza) is operational now. The latest comers to the market are coaching institutes, small clinics, and hospitals. Their rate of growth shows the demand these services have in the city.

Wholesale 
Chas is especially well known for its wholesale markets. As such, the city is home to many small and medium-sized businesses, which are overseen by apex trade associations, like the Bokaro Chamber of Commerce and Industries, Jainamore Chamber of Commerce and Jharkhand Small Tiny Service Business Enterprises Association. In recent years, Chas has also had an influx of retail and supermarket chains (like V-Mart, Citi Style, etc.) and vehicle showrooms of KTM, Honda, Hero, Maruti Suzuki, JCB, Yamaha, TVS, Mahindra.

Utilities 

BPSCL Power Plant is a power plant in Bokaro Steel City. This is a coal-based thermal power plant located in Bokaro district. The power plant is owned by Bokaro Power Supply Company Limited, a joint venture between Steel Authority of India and Damodar Valley Corporation. It supplies power and process steam to Bokaro Steel Plant and surplus power to grid.

Future projects 
|SAIL-POSCO JV Steel Plant: Steel minister Sri Virbhadra Singh has announced another new steel plant for Bokaro as part of a joint venture with Posco and SAIL by using FINEX technologies for high quality steel. The capacity of the plant will be 1.5 mt, establish in BSP periphery of 500 acres (2.0 km2) will be built in Bokaro.

Bharat Petroleum Corporation Limited - BPCL will set up a LPG bottling plant and POL (petroleum, oil and lubricants) terminal in Bokaro, the foundation stone of which was laid on 11 August 2019 at Marafari in Bokaro.

Software Technology Parks of India - STPI will setup an IT Park in Bokaro soon.

Markets and business districts 
The main central business districts of the city are:

 City Centre, Bokaro
 Sector 4 (Bokaro)
 Chas

Economic zones and areas of Bokaro

Sector 4 

 Sector 4 is the main commercial area of the city. It is nearer to Marafari. Sector 4 has many shopping complexes around it. Here is also famous temple Jagannath Temple and Jama Masjid at Sector 4. This place is nearer to Marafari. Some parts of Bokaro Steel Plant came under Sector 4 itself. Here is many schools in this area. One of them being DAV Public School, which is one of the most popular schools in India. It also has other branches also. Chinmaya Vidyalayas are also other popular schools. It has branches in other cities like Hyderabad etc.

City Centre 

 City Centre is the main Central Business District of the city. As many peoples the city came here to buy things. Here is also many banks, shopping complexes, playgrounds, etc.

Marafari 

 Marafari is the main industrial hub and area of the city here is the famous companies of Bokaro Steel City.

These companies are and it includes

 Bokaro Steel Plant
 Steel Authority of India (SAIL)
 Dalmia East Cement Bharat Ltd
 JP Cement
 Vedanta Electrosteel Castings Ltd
 BPSCL Power Plant

and many more.

Balidih 

 Balidih is one of the major neighbourhoods of the city. It is one of the major industrial hubs of Bokaro along with Marafari. Here is the famous Holy Cross School located at this area. Here is the famous tourist spot known as Garga Dam.

Chas 

 Chas is a city and neighbourhood of Bokaro. It has a developed economy. It has a history during World War II and its economic history also. Chas is especially well known for its wholesale markets. As such, the city is home to many small and medium-sized businesses, which are overseen by apex trade associations, like the Bokaro Chamber of Commerce and Industries, Jainamore Chamber of Commerce and Jharkhand Small Tiny Service Business Enterprises Association. In recent years, Chas has also had an influx of retail and supermarket chains (like V-Mart, Citi Style, etc.) and vehicle showrooms of KTM, Honda, Hero, Maruti Suzuki, JCB, Yamaha, TVS, Mahindra.

Balidih Industrial Area 

 A special economic zone in the city at Balidih.

See also 

 Jamshedpur
 Economy of Jharkhand State
 Economy of Jamshedpur
 Economy of Deoghar

References

Bokaro district
Economy of Jharkhand